Stuart Parker (born 30 July 1997) is a British tennis player, he is coached by former world
number 4 Thomas Enqvist at his base in Aix-en-Provence.

In February and March 2021, Parker won two titles on the ITF circuit, both in Tunisia.

He was selected for a wildcard into the  2021 Queen's Club Championships – Doubles main draw partnering James Ward. He was also awarded a wildcard into the qualifying rounds of the singles and lost to Spain's Bernabé Zapata Miralles 6–3, 6–4.

He received a wildcard for the main draw of the 2021 Wimbledon Championships men’s doubles alongside Ward, and a wildcard into the qualifying for the men’s singles.

In September 2022, Parker won his first Singles Challenger tournament in Nonthaburi, entering the main draw as a qualifier and defeating Arthur Cazaux in the finals.

ATP Challenger and ITF Futures finals

Singles: 6 (4–2)

Doubles: 2 (0–2)

References

1997 births
Living people
British male tennis players
Sportspeople from Port Elizabeth